The 1987 Torneo Descentralizado, the top tier of Peruvian football (soccer), was played by 30 teams. The season started in 1987 and ended in early 1988. The national champion was Universitario .

The national championship was divided into two tournaments, the Regional Tournament and the Descentralized Tournament. The winners of each tournament faced off in the final and received the berths for the Copa Libertadores 1988. The Regional Tournament divided the teams into four groups; Metropolitan, North, Central, and South. Each group had its teams qualify for the Regional Finals, the Descentralized Tournament and the Intermediary Division. The Regional Finals determined the Regional Champion. The Descentralized Tournament divided the teams in three groups and had its teams qualify for the Descentralized Liguilla which decided the Descentralized Champion. The Intermediary Division was a promotion/relegation tournament between first and second division teams.

Torneo Regional

Metropolitan

First Place Playoff

North

Central

South

Liguilla Regional

Torneo Descentralizado

Liguilla

Championship Match

Title

Topscorer

International competition
Copa Libertadores 1988
Universitario - Second Stage; eliminated by América de Cali.
Alianza Lima - fourth place in Group 5 with 3 points; eliminated.

External links
RSSSF Peru 1987

1987
Peru
Torneo Descentralizado, 1987